Pecel lele or pecak lele is an Indonesian deep-fried Clarias catfish dish originating from Lamongan, East Java, Indonesia.

Dish
It consists of catfish served with traditional sambal chili paste, often served with fried tempeh and/or tofu and steamed rice. It is a popular Javanese dish widely distributed in Indonesian cities, especially in Java. However, it is often associated with Lamongan town, west of Surabaya in East Java, as majority of pecel lele seller hailed from this town. Often served in a street-side humble tent warung in Indonesian cities, pecel lele can be considered as an affordable food for everybody. Today, due to migrations of Javanese people to neighboring countries, pecel lele can also be found in Singapore and Malaysia.

Although it has a similar name, it should not be confused with another Javanese dish, pecel, which is a vegetables dish served in peanut sauce. Pecel lele is not served in peanut sauce, but in sambal terasi (ground chili with shrimp paste sauce) instead. However, some recipes might add a little bit of ground peanuts into their sambals.

See also

 Ikan goreng
 Ikan bakar
 Pecel
 Sambal

References

External links 
Pecel Lele recipe (In Indonesian)

Indonesian cuisine
Javanese cuisine
Fish dishes
Street food in Indonesia